Ras Kasar is a cape in northeastern Africa, on the border between Eritrea and Sudan at the Red Sea. It is the northernmost point in Eritrea and the easternmost point in Sudan.

References
Geoview

OpenStreetMap

Landforms of Eritrea
Landforms of Sudan 
Eritrea–Sudan border
International landforms
Headlands of Africa
Red Sea